Science Applications International Corporation (SAIC), Inc. is an American technology company headquartered in Reston, Virginia that provides government services and information technology support.

History 
The original SAIC was created in 1969 by J. Robert Beyster. Then on September 27, 2013, it spun off a $4 billion unit which retained its name, while the parent company changed its name to Leidos. Following the split, Anthony J. Moraco was appointed CEO of SAIC, and John P. Jumper was appointed CEO of Leidos.  The primary motivation for the spinoff was the conflicts of interest provisions in the Federal Acquisition Regulation which prevented the company from bidding on some new contracts because of existing contracts.

On May 4, 2015, SAIC acquired Scitor Holdings, Inc. for $790 million to expand their presence in the intelligence industry through classified contracts, cleared personnel, and a robust security infrastructure. Scitor was previously owned by Leonard Green & Partners, L.P., a private equity firm.

On September 10, 2018, SAIC announced its acquisition of Engility, a competitor in the U.S. government services contracting sector, for a combined US$2.5 billion with the merger set to take place in January 2019.

On February 6, 2020, SAIC announced its acquisition of Unisys US Federal, a competitor in the U.S. government services contracting sector, for a combined US$1.2 billion.

Operations 
SAIC has adopted a matrix operating model in which different service lines collaborate to serve a given contract.

People 
Deborah Lee James, president of SAIC's technology and engineering sector, was sworn in as Secretary of the Air Force on December 20, 2013, after being appointed by President Barack Obama.

References

External links

2013 establishments in Virginia
American companies established in 2013
Companies based in Reston, Virginia
Companies listed on the New York Stock Exchange
Corporate spin-offs
Defense companies of the United States
Engineering companies of the United States